Ernst Pringsheim Jr. or Ernst Georg Pringsheim (October 26, 1881 in Breslau, Lower Silesia – December 26, 1970 in Hannover) was a German Natural scientist and plant physiology.

He taught as a professor for biochemistry and botany, in the University of Berlin, University of Prague, and Cambridge University.

Life 
He was a son of Hugo Pringsheim (- 1915, Oppeln, Oberschlesien), and Hedwig Johanna Heymann (1856–1938).

Personal 
In 1907 he married Lily Chun (1887–1954); they divorced in 1921, having had five children. He married pharmacist Olga Zimmermann (1902–1992) in Prague in 1929.

References 
 D. Mollenhauer: "The protistologist Ernst Georg Pringsheim and his four lives", Protist 154(2003), 157–171;
 D. Mollenhauer: "Historical aspects of culturing microalgae in Central Europe and the impact of Ernst Georg Pringsheim, a pioneer in algae culture collection", in preparation;

External links 
 

German naturalists
20th-century German botanists
Academic staff of Charles University
1881 births
1970 deaths
Plant physiologists
20th-century naturalists